Alone (released in the UK as Final Days) is a 2020 American horror film directed by Johnny Martin and starring Tyler Posey and Donald Sutherland. The film follows a young man who barricades himself inside his apartment during a zombie apocalypse. The film was released on October 16, 2020.

Plot
A young man is recording a video log on his laptop saying goodbye right before he is about to hang himself in his apartment.

The young man is Aidan (Tyler Posey). Forty-two days before his suicide attempt, he was living a peaceful life awaking from a tryst with a random girl. During that morning, a violent outbreak happens outside his apartment; everyone is being attacked by infected people called Screamers. Aidan encounters his first Screamer via his neighbor Brandon, who entered Aidan's apartment after being attacked by his roommate. Aidan threatens Brandon with a kitchen knife to leave after noticing a wound in the back of his neck, later Brandon begins to turn, and Aidan gets him out of his apartment in time before the change is complete.

On the news, Aidan learns the virus is transferred by bite and scratching. The symptoms of being infected include bleeding eyes, rage, cannibalism, inhuman screaming, and repeating the last words said before turning. The news reports that the Screamers are aware of what they're doing but can not stop themselves; their repeated use of their last words are an attempt to plead for someone to stop them. Aidan tries contacting his family but the signal is not working on his phone. He can receive the text messages his Dad sent him, informing Aidan that his sister got away but is out of contact. He and Aidan's mom are trying to reach Aidan but are having trouble with the outbreak. The last message is for Aidan to 'Stay Alive' and not leave his home till they arrive.

Aidan follows his Dad's orders and isolates himself in the apartment. Over time he tallies the days that pass on his bathroom mirror, keeps video logs on his laptop, and tries to keep himself entertained. Eventually, he begins to run out of food, the water in his building is cut off, and he begins to hallucinate about his parents. He receives his first real threat when a Screamer breaks into his home using the air ducts connecting the rooms. He fights the Screamer off with a baseball bat and dumps the body off his balcony while sealing the vent the Screamer crashed through.

He finally receives a voicemail from his mother. His emotional state takes a  turn for the worst when he listens and learns that his parents died while hiding from Screamers. Aidan suffers an emotional breakdown and falls into despair.

Having no hope left, he attempts suicide, calling back to the opening of the story when he recorded his last video log. The moment he readies to hang himself he sees a woman on a balcony across from his, a normal human woman. He gives up his suicide attempt and now has found renewed hope. He contacts her the next morning using premade cue cards and learns her name is Eva. The two strike up a friendship, with Aidan offering his reserved bottled water for her. He later gets Brandon's keys and grabs the remaining food and rock climbing gear to help Eva, even finding radios for them to communicate.

Aidan and Eva bond more and decide for Eva to escape to Aidan's room. He first travels the air ducts to find more supplies for them to wait it out. Aidan hits jackpot when he enters a room stocked with food, but Eva warns him to leave as the room is barricaded with no one inside signaling it may be a trap. Aidan is surprised by Edward (Donald Sutherland), an older survivor who entered the room before Aidan after the original tenant killed himself. Edward and Aidan initially have a conversation about the situation and different philosophies about life after death, then Edward hits Aidan with his bat while his guard is down.

Edward ties Aidan up in the bedroom to be a sacrifice for his wife, who has turned. Aidan is saved when Eva calls the radio, providing a distraction that allows Aidan to escape and feed Edward to his wife. He grabs his belongings and runs to his room, drops from his balcony to the ground using a makeshift rope of bed sheets, fights off Screamers, and makes it to Eva. They both fight to return to Aidan's apartment, with Eva entering the room first while Aidan fights off a Screamer. He returns covered in blood but believes he's been infected when a mark on his shirt is revealed. He goes to jump to his death so he won't turn and kill Eva who pleads for him not to leave her. After removing his shirt they are both overjoyed to see there is no bite and Aidan won't turn. They run to Aidan's door to hold the refrigerator back against it, stopping the Screamers from entering. They promise to survive together till the end.

Cast
Tyler Posey as Aidan
Donald Sutherland as Edward
Summer Spiro as Eva
Robert Ri'chard as Brandon
John Posey as Dad
Eric Etebari as Jack Brian
Maya Karin as Medical Analyst

Release
The film was released via video-on-demand on October 16, 2020 and on DVD and Blu-ray on October 20, 2020.

Reception
The review aggregator website Rotten Tomatoes surveyed  and, categorizing the reviews as positive or negative, assessed two as positive and six as negative for  rating.

See also
#Alive, a 2020 Korean film based on the same script

References

External links
 
 

American zombie films
Apocalyptic films
2020 films
2020 horror films
Films scored by Frederik Wiedmann
Films set in apartment buildings
2020s survival films
American survival films
Films about viral outbreaks
Films impacted by the COVID-19 pandemic
2020s English-language films
2020s American films